Isabelle Salmon Ross (November 1, 1867 – December 28, 1947) was a member of the general presidency of the Primary organization of the Church of Jesus Christ of Latter-day Saints from 1925 to 1939.

Isabelle Salmon was born in Perry, Utah Territory to William Weir Salmon and Margaret Hay Hunter. She was trained as a schoolteacher at the University of Utah and Harvard University. She taught in the public school system in Salt Lake City and at Brigham Young College and the Utah State School for the Deaf and the Blind in Ogden. In 1897, she married Charles James Ross in the Salt Lake Temple; Charles Ross was from Ogden and was a member of the general board of the Deseret Sunday School Union.

In 1925, when May Anderson became the general president of the Primary, Isabelle Ross was selected as her second counselor. Ross acted in this capacity until 1929, when Ross became Anderson's first counselor to succeed Sadie Pack Grant. Ross continued as a member of the Primary general presidency until 1939, when Anderson and her counselors were released as a general presidency.

Ross died in Salt Lake City and was buried at the Salt Lake City Cemetery.

References

External links

State of Utah Death Certificate: Isabelle Salmon Ross

1867 births
1947 deaths
American leaders of the Church of Jesus Christ of Latter-day Saints
American women educators
Burials at Salt Lake City Cemetery
Counselors in the General Presidency of the Primary (LDS Church)
Harvard University alumni
Latter Day Saints from Utah
People from Box Elder County, Utah
People from Ogden, Utah
Schoolteachers from Utah
University of Utah alumni